

Æthelbald was a medieval Archbishop of York.

Æthelbald was consecrated in 900. He died between 904 and 928.

Notes

Citations

References

External links
 

Archbishops of York
9th-century English bishops
10th-century English archbishops
9th-century births
10th-century deaths